The following is a timeline of the history of the city of Halle an der Saale, Germany.

Prior to 19th century

 981 - Town chartered by Otto II, Holy Roman Emperor.
 1100 - At the beginning of the 12th century Halle was an important member of the Hanseatic League
 1388 -  (church) construction begins.
 1484 - Moritzburg (Halle) (castle) construction begins.
 1506 -  (tower) built.
 1552 -  (library) founded.
 1554 - Marktkirche Unser Lieben Frauen (church) built.
 1648 - After the Peace of Westphalia, the city came into the possession of the House of Brandenburg
 1685 - Future composer George Frideric Handel born in Halle.
 1694 - University founded.
 1696 -  founded.
 1751 - Population: 13,460.(de)

19th century
 1806 - 17 October: Battle of Halle fought during the War of the Fourth Coalition; French win.
 1813 - Town was taken by the Prussians.
 1815 - University of Halle-Wittenberg active.
 1819 - Population: 23,408.(de)
 1870 - Gewerblichen Zeichenschule (school) founded.
 1872 - Halle–Cottbus railway begins operating.
 1880 - Population: 71,484.
 1882 - Horse-drawn tram begins operating.
 1886 - Stadttheater built.
 1890 - Halle (Saale) Hauptbahnhof (train station) opens.
 1894 -  (city hall) built.
 1891 - Electric tram begins operating.
 1900 - Population: 156,609.

20th century

 1905 - Population: 160,031.
 1918 - Halle State Museum of Prehistory opens.
 1919 - Population: 182,326.
 1922 -  (school) active.
 1923 - Stadion am Gesundbrunnen (stadium) opens.
 1940 -  begins.
 1944 - Halle concentration camp begins operating.
 1950 - Turbine Halle (sport club) formed.
 1966 - Hallescher FC (football club) formed.
 1967 - City of Halle-Neustadt established near Halle.
 1990 - Halle-Neustadt becomes part of Halle.
 1992 - Halle Institute for Economic Research established.
 2000 - Verein für hallische Stadtgeschichte (history society) founded.

21st century

 2006 - Rebuilt  opens.
 2011 - Erdgas Sportpark opens.
 2012 - Bernd Wiegand becomes mayor.
 2015 - Population: 236,991.(de)

See also
 Halle history (de)
 
 
 History of Saxony-Anhalt

Other cities in the state of Saxony-Anhalt:(de)
 Timeline of Magdeburg

References

This article incorporates information from the German Wikipedia.

Bibliography

in English
 
 
 
 

in German
 
 
 
 
  2003-

External links

  (city archives)
 Links to fulltext city directories for Halle via Wikisource
 Items related to Halle, various dates (via Europeana)
 Items related to Halle, various dates (via Digital Public Library of America)

halle
Halle (Saale)
halle